This is a list of notable Australian companies operating in China, grouped by their Industry Classification Benchmark sector.

Basic materials

Basic resources 
 BlueScope, steel
 Fortescue Metals Group, mining
 Orica, mining support
 Rio Tinto, mining
 Sino Gold, mining, main business is the mining of gold in China

Food and beverage 
 Bulla Dairy Foods, dairy
 De Bortoli Wines, winery
 Elders, agriculture

Personal and household goods 
 Billabong, clothing
 Cotton On, clothing
 Rip Curl, surf brand

Consumer services

Retail 
 Arnott's Biscuits
 Wesfarmers, retailer conglomerate
 Woolworths, retail

Media 
 Australian Broadcasting Corporation, radio and television broadcasting
 Nine Network, television broadcasting
 Seven Network, television broadcasting

Financials

Banks 
 Australia & New Zealand Banking Group
 Commonwealth Bank
 National Australia Bank
 Westpac

Financial services 
 AMP, financial services

Health care 
 Cochlear, biotech
 CSL, biotech
 Ramsay Health Care, private hospitals
 Sigma Pharmaceuticals, pharmaceuticals

Industrials

Construction and materials 
 Atlas Arteria, roads and infrastructure
 Leighton Asia, infrastructure contractor
 Lendlease, infrastructure
 Woods Bagot, architecture consulting

Industrial goods and services 
 Australia Post, postal service
 ResMed, medical equipment manufacturer
 Toll Group, freight and logistics company
 Worley, consulting

Oil and gas 
 BHP, oil
 Woodside Petroleum, petroleum exploration and production

Telecommunications 
 Telstra, telecommunications

Travel and leisure 
 Crown Resorts, gaming, hotels
 Flight Centre, travel services
 Jetstar, airline
 Qantas, airline
 Virgin Australia, airline

External links 
 List of Australian Companies in China - The China Australia Chamber of Commerce (AustCham) -

Lists of companies of China
Lists of companies of Australia